The 1982–83 Albanian National Championship was the 44th season of the Albanian National Championship, the top professional league for association football clubs, since its establishment in 1930.

Overview
It was contested by 14 teams, and Vllaznia won the championship.

League table

Note: '17 Nëntori' is Tirana, 'Lokomotiva Durrës' is Teuta, 'Labinoti' is Elbasani, 'Traktori' is Lushnja

Results

Relegation/promotion playoff

Season statistics

Top scorers

References

Albania - List of final tables (RSSSF)

Kategoria Superiore seasons
1
Albania